Whitehall House, 41 and 43 Whitehall, London, is a grade II listed building designed by Treadwell & Martin.

References

External links
 
 

Grade II listed buildings in the City of Westminster
Buildings and structures completed in 1904